is a Japanese corporation specializing in the manufacture and sale of remote-controlling electrical cables and accessories for two-and four-wheel vehicles, construction and industrial machinery, household and welfare appliances, medical equipment and marine vessels.

The company is listed on the Tokyo Stock Exchange and the Osaka Securities Exchange and as of October 31, 2012 the company has 26 subsidiaries.

In Japan the company has offices in Takarazuka, Tokyo, Nagoya and Hiroshima, factories in Takarazuka, Tamba, Sanda, Hamamatsu, Toyooka, Hamada, Honjo, Mobara, technical center in Utsunomiya and research center in Suwa.

Overseas it has factories and offices in Germany, Hungary, China, India, Indonesia, Vietnam, Thailand, South Korea, UK, the United States and Mexico.

In 2016, the launch of production in Tolyatti, Russia.

References

External links

 

Companies based in Hyōgo Prefecture
Manufacturing companies of Japan
Defense companies of Japan
Companies listed on the Tokyo Stock Exchange
Companies listed on the Osaka Exchange
1970s initial public offerings